Abby Jimenez is an American romance novelist and founder of Nadia Cakes. She is the author of the books The Friend Zone (2019), The Happy Ever After Playlist (2020) (both gaining recognition as USA Today best sellers.)

She later released her third and fourth novels, Life's Too Short (2021) and Part of Your World (2022). Life's Too Short and Part of Your World both went on to become USA Today and New York Times Bestsellers. Her novels have been optioned by Thruline Entertainment, which has begun work on a film adaptation of The Happy Ever After Playlist.

Career

Jimenez was a retail manager in 2007. She lost her job and founded Nadia Cakes in the same year. She now owns and operates cake shops in Maple Grove and Woodbury in Minnesota and in Palmdale, California. She was the winner of Food Network’s Cupcake Wars in 2013.

Works

 The Friend Zone (2019)
 The Happy Ever After Playlist (2020)
 Life’s Too Short (2021)
 Part of Your World (2022)

Awards
Jimenez's Life's Too Short won a 2022 Minnesota Book Award in the Genre Fiction category.

Her novel The Friend Zone was a bestseller in Poland and won an Empik award in 2020. The audiobook for her 2019 novel The Friend Zone, narrated by Teddy Hamilton and Erin Mallon, was nominated for an Audie Award for Romance in 2020.

References

External links
 

Year of birth missing (living people)
Living people
21st-century American novelists
American women novelists
American romantic fiction novelists
Women romantic fiction writers
American bakers
21st-century American women